Borana National Park (also known as Borena National Park) is a national park in southern Ethiopia. The national park was established in 2017 and is one of Ethiopia's largest protected areas.

Geography
Borana National Park is located in southern Ethiopia. It covers an area of 45,366 km2. The park lies at the southern edge of the Ethiopian Highlands. It is bounded on the south by the Kenya–Ethiopia border. It adjoins Chelbi Wildlife Reserve to the west, and Yabelo Wildlife Sanctuary to the north.

The park conservation sites are divided into multiple blocks based on their biodiversity, community, and environment: Yabello, Dida-Hara, Gammedo, Danbala-Dhibayu, and Sarite blocks. The park is home to Booqee Sadeen, three volcanic crater lakes that were introduced as the main tourist attraction, including El Sod which is known for providing access to mineral water and salt varieties for the locals.

Wildlife

Flora
Most of the park areas are covered in dry bushlands, thickets, and grasslands which are part of the Somali Acacia–Commiphora bushlands and thickets ecoregion. The Ethiopian montane forests ecoregion extends into the north-central portion of the park and includes Afromontane regions, dry evergreen trees, juniper trees, and open savannas.

Fauna
Borana National Park is home to at least 40 species of mammals. It is uniquely known for providing sanctuary for two separate species of zebras that are found within grasslands and woodland areas: the abundantly rare Plain zebras and the endangered Grevy's zebras. Other mammals that are rarely found in Borana National Park include lesser kudus, greater kudus, black-backed jackals, Beisa oryxes, gerenuks, warthogs, Soemmerring's gazelles, and Grant's gazelles. The herds of Swayne's hartebeest once thrived here but were extirpated from these regions. 

Similar to Yabelo Wildlife Sanctuary, Borana National Park provides multiple bird species that are recorded at least 280 species. Ethiopian bushcrows, white-tailed swallows, Prince Ruspoli’s turacoes, and black-fronted spurfowls are four endemic species found within the park that are considered endangered. Other birds include ostriches, short-tailed larks, Pringle's puffbacks, northern grey tits, eastern yellow-billed hornbill, Abyssinian grosbeak-canaries, vulturine guineafowl, Somali sparrows, black-capped social weavers, Donaldson Smith's nightjars, star-spotted nightjars, grey-headed social weavers, magpie starlings, little spotted woodpeckers, grey-headed silverbills, and tawny pipits are found within Borana National Park.

Conservation
The park's area is established to help restore wildlife along with the community based on environmental recovery and ecological changes, which include repopulating zebra species and drought prevention. During its establishment, the area was formerly designated as a controlled hunting zone and was later redesignated as a national park because of its poor management. The park is administered by the Oromia Forest & Wildlife Enterprise (OFWA) of the Oromia Region government along with the Ethiopian Wildlife Conservation Authority (EWCA).. Today, the area was now facing multiple threats and challenges that might threaten the park's ecosystem such as droughts, invasive species expansions, livestock overgrazing, and road collisions.

References

National parks of Ethiopia
Protected areas of Oromia Region
Somali Region
2017 establishments in Ethiopia
Protected areas established in 2017